

Christian Usinger (21 August 1894 – 2 April 1949) was a German general during World War II who commanded the I Army Corps. He was a recipient of the Knight's Cross of the Iron Cross of Nazi Germany. Usinger surrendered to the Soviet Forces in 1945 in the Courland Pocket. He died in a POW camp in the Soviet Union in early 1949.

Awards and decorations

 German Cross in Gold on 19 September 1942 as Oberst in Arko 110
 Knight's Cross of the Iron Cross on 9 June 1944 as Generalmajor and leader of the 81. Infanterie-Division

References

Citations

Bibliography

 
 Patzwall, Klaus D. and Scherzer, Veit (2001). Das Deutsche Kreuz 1941–1945 Geschichte und Inhaber Band II. Norderstedt, Germany: Verlag Klaus D. Patzwall. .

1894 births
1949 deaths
Lieutenant generals of the German Army (Wehrmacht)
German Army personnel of World War I
Recipients of the Gold German Cross
Recipients of the Knight's Cross of the Iron Cross
German prisoners of war in World War II held by the Soviet Union
German people who died in Soviet detention
People from Wilhelmshaven
People from the Province of Hanover
Military personnel from Lower Saxony
German Army generals of World War II